The British V-class submarines were built by Vickers, Barrow during World War I in response to Scotts, Greenock building the S class and Armstrong Whitworth building the W class.

Four V-class submarines were built.

Boats

References 
 

British V-class submarines (1914)